The Medical Act 1983 (c 54) is an Act of the Parliament of the United Kingdom which governs the regulation and credentials of the medical profession, and defines offences in respect of false claims of fitness to practise medicine.

Detail
The act consolidated the Medical Acts 1956 to 1978 and with certain related provisions and amendments gave effect to recommendations of the Law Commission and the Scottish Law Commission.

The Medical Act (21 & 22 Vict c 90), passed in 1858, established the General Council of Medical Education & Registration of the United Kingdom, now known as the GMC. It stated that under the Poor Law system boards of guardians could only employ those qualified in medicine and surgery as Poor Law doctors. Poor Law hospitals were transferred to local government by the Poor Law Act 1930. These were unified under the National Health Service Act 1946.

The 1858 Act also created the position of Registrar of the General Medical Council — an office still in existence today — whose duty is to keep an up-to-date record of those registered with the membership body and to make them publicly available.

The Brynmor Jones Working Party on the Constitution of the GMC reported in 1971. Subsequently, the government announced its intention to introduce a bill to reconstitute the GMC. At the same time about 8,000 doctors, with support from the BMA, refused to pay the annual £5 retention fee. It was submitted in Parliament that the GMC had asked for amendments of the Medical Act 1956 in order to secure a striking off from the register of any doctor who did not pay the levy. A public inquiry into the structure and function of the GMC, headed by Dr Alec Merrison, followed with evidence submitted by a BMA committee in 1973.

The Medical Act 1978, which followed the Merrison Report  made the GMC more accountable, extended its functions particularly in relation to medical education, and separated the disciplinary processes from those that deal with doctors whose performance is impaired by ill-health. The provisions of the 1978 Act were consolidated into the Medical Act 1983 (as amended by statutory instrument) and set out the modern structure of the council.

The Medical (Professional Performance) Act 1995 (c.51) amended the 1983 act and made provisions relating to the professional performance of registered medical practitioners and the voluntary removal of names from the register of medical practitioners.

The General Medical Council's power, under the enabling Medical Act 1983, to make regulations with respect to the medical register can only come into force when approved by order of the Privy Council. Orders of Council are orders that do not require personal approval by the sovereign, but which can be made by the Lords of the Privy Council. These can be statutory or made under the royal prerogative. Statutory Orders of Council include approval of regulations made by the General Medical Council and other regulatory bodies.

Significant Orders of Council with respect to the Act are: 
The General Medical Council (Fitness to Practise) Rules Order of Council 2004 and 
The General Medical Council (Voluntary Erasure and Restoration following Voluntary Erasure) Regulations Order of Council 2004.

References

United Kingdom Acts of Parliament 1983
Acts of the Parliament of the United Kingdom concerning healthcare